Cygnet Estuary Conservation Park is a protected area located on the west coast of Nepean Bay on Kangaroo Island in South Australia about  west southwest of Kingscote.  It was proclaimed under the National Parks and Wildlife Act 1972 in 2014 on the basis that some existing crown land 'should be protected and preserved for the purpose of conserving any wildlife and the natural features of the land'.  The Cygnet Estuary which is considered to be a significant wetland is located within the boundaries of the conservation park.

See also
 Cygnet River
 Cygnet River, South Australia

References

Conservation parks of South Australia
Protected areas established in 2014
2014 establishments in Australia
Protected areas of Kangaroo Island
Estuaries of South Australia